An eco-map (or ecomap) is a graphical representation that shows all of the systems at play in an individual's life. Eco-maps are used in individual and family counseling within the social work and nursing profession. They are often a way of portraying Systems Theory in a simplistic way that both the social worker and the client can look at during the session. These ecological maps, or ecomaps, were developed by Hartman in 1975 as a means of depicting the ecological system that encompasses a family or individual.

An ecogram is a combination of a genogram and an ecomap. The terms "ecogram" and "ecomap" are often used interchangeably, however.

Symbols 
At the center of the eco-map is the client (this can either be a family or individual). They are depicted in the center of the circle. Family connections are shown. There are also connections from all of the relevant systems that are at play in the clients life. These systems are connected to either individuals or the entire circle by line:
 Arrows pointing both direction depicts a two direction flow of influence
 Arrows pointing to the client mean that the system primarily influences the client
 Arrows pointing to the system mean that the client primarily influences the system
 Curvy or red lines mean that the system is a stressful relationship
 Thicker (darker) lines mean stronger relationship

Other uses
In the context of ecology, ecogram can also refer to a kind of Venn diagram used to depict the niches a plant may live in, depending on the environmental conditions, especially used in forestry. See e.g. :de:Ökogramm.

See also 
 Culturagram
 Family Therapy
 Systems Theory

References

External links 
 Genogram & Eco-map assignment for SOWK 460, an example of an eco-map done in MS Word
Psychological tests and scales